Kamal (Kam) Ghaffarian is an American businessman known as the founder of IBX, Axiom Space, Intuitive Machines, and X-energy.

Early life and career 
Ghaffarian was born in Iran and came to the United States at age 17. He holds dual B.S. degree in Computer Science and Electronics Engineering, an M.Sc. in Information Management, and a PhD in Management Information Systems. He started at Stinger Ghaffarian Technologies, co-founded with Harold Stinger in 1994. The company operated as a contractor to government agencies and was acquired by KBR for $355 million in February 2018.

Ghaffarian founded X-energy LLC in 2009. The company designs high-temperature gas-cooled nuclear reactors. He also co-founded Intuitive Machines in 2013. In  2016, he co-founded Houston-based Axiom Space with Michael Suffredini. As of October 2019, Ghaffarian is appointed to the Nuclear Energy Institute’s Board of Directors.

References

External links 

 IBX

Nonprofit businesspeople
American company founders
Year of birth missing (living people)
Living people
Axiom Space